Malcolm Dunkley (12 July 1961 – 24 September 2005) was an English professional footballer.

Dunkley started his career with Bromsgrove Rovers, before joining Stafford Rangers. In 1988, he signed a contract with Finnish top division club RoPS Rovaniemi. After one season in Division Four with Lincoln City Dunkley returned to Finland and played two seasons in the Veikkausliiga for Rovaniemi. Dunkley ended his career with Finnish second-tier club FC Kontu.

After his professional career Dunkley spent several years in Finland as a coach. He died of a heart attack at the age of 44.

References 

1961 births
2005 deaths
Footballers from Wolverhampton
English footballers
Bromsgrove Rovers F.C. players
Stafford Rangers F.C. players
Lincoln City F.C. players
Veikkausliiga players
Rovaniemen Palloseura players
English Football League players
English expatriate footballers
Expatriate footballers in Finland
Place of death missing
FC Kontu players
Association football forwards